The 2012 Asian Youth Girls Volleyball Championship was held in Shuangliu County, Chengdu, China. Japan won the tournament and Sarina Koga was selected the Most Valuable Player.

Pools composition
The teams are seeded based on their final ranking at the 2010 Asian Youth Girls Volleyball Championship.

* Withdrew

Preliminary round

Pool A

|}

|}

|}

Pool B

|}

|}

Pool C

|}

|}

Pool D

|}

|}

Classification round
 The results and the points of the matches between the same teams that were already played during the preliminary round shall be taken into account for the classification round.

Pool E

|}

|}

Pool F

|}

|}

Pool G

|}

|}

Pool H

|}

|}

Classification 9th–12th

Semifinals

|}

11th place

|}

9th place

|}

Final round

Quarterfinals

|}

5th–8th semifinals

|}

Semifinals

|}

7th place

|}

5th place

|}

3rd place

|}

Final

|}

Final standing

Team Roster
Yuki Serizawa, Sarina Koga, Shino Nakata, Yurika Kono, Hinako Hayashi, Nanaka Sakamoto, Misaki Shirai, Yuka Kitsui, Akane Ukishima, Minami Takaso, Airi Tahara, Minori Wada
Head Coach: Ichiro Hanzawa

Awards
 MVP:  Sarina Koga
 Best Scorer:  Sarina Koga
 Best Spiker:  Hu Mingyuan
 Best Blocker:  Yuan Xinyue
 Best Server:  Chen Tzu-ya
 Best Setter:  Airi Tahara
 Best Libero:  Lin Miao-hua

References

External links
Asian Volleyball Confederation
FIVB

Asian women's volleyball championships
Asian Cup
V
V
Asian Girls' U17 Volleyball Championship